Marta Dhanis (born 14 October in Lisbon , Portugal) is a Portuguese journalist and author. She currently works for Fox News Channel and was previously TVI’s, Portugal's leading news channel, U.S. correspondent.

Dhanis has covered major news events such as Presidential elections, the Death of Osama Bin Laden, the Sandy Hook Elementary School shooting, and the terror attacks in Boston, New York and Barcelona.

Dhanis also teaches and has published an investigative journalism book about the high-profile murder case of Carlos Castro and trial of Renato Seabra in New York City.

References

Living people
1982 births